The Endowment Fund for the Rehabilitation of Tigray (EFFORT) (Tigrinya: ትካል እግሪ ምትካል ትግራይ) is a conglomerate of businesses factories mainly based in Tigray Region, Ethiopia in order to improve the local economy that was devastated by the Ethiopian Civil War and the 1983–1985 famine.

Note: EFFORT holds a 51% stake in Addis Pharmaceuticals, the miniority shareholder being a Private Equity Company 
EFFORT no longer owns Selam Horticulture, Dimma Honey, and Raya Field Agroprocessing. BNN Bloomberg on November 18 reported that EFFORTs fund were frozen because its subsidiary “companies [are] allegedly “participating in financing ethnic-based violence, acts of terrorism, connection with the TPLF, which seek[ed] to overthrow the constitutional order,” the office said in a statement on Facebook. Tigray President Debretsion Gebremichael [currently wanted by the Federal government] didn’t immediately respond to a request for comment sent by mobile phone.”

References 

Tigray Region
Conglomerate companies of Ethiopia
Business organisations based in Ethiopia